Actinocrinites (from  , 'ray' and   'to perceive') is an extinct genus of crinoids.

Fossil records
This genus is known in the fossil record from the Devonian period to the Permian period (age range: 360.7 to 290.1 million years ago). Fossils of species within this genus have been found in Australia, China, Europe and United States.

Species
Species within this genus include:

†Actinocrinites batheri Whidborne 1896
†Actinocrinites brouweri Wanner 1924
†Actinocrinites zhaoae Waters et al. 2003
†Actinocrinites triacontadactylus

References

Monobathrida
Devonian crinoids
Carboniferous animals of Europe
Prehistoric echinoderms of Europe
Mississippian animals of North America
Devonian first appearances
Permian genus extinctions
Carboniferous crinoids
Permian crinoids